Kentucky Route 680 (KY 680) is an   state highway in Kentucky. KY 680's western terminus is at KY 80 south-southeast of Eastern, and the eastern terminus is at U.S. Route 23 (US 23), US 460 and KY 80 in Harold

Major intersections

References

0680
Transportation in Floyd County, Kentucky